Västerbotten cheese is a cheese from the Västerbotten region of Sweden.

History
The village of Burträsk (now part of the Skellefteå municipality) claims Västerbotten cheese was invented there in the 1870s, supposedly by a dairy maid, . According to legend, she was left alone to stir the curd of a traditional cheese but was interrupted, either by other chores or an assignation with her lover.  This resulted in alternating periods of heating and stirring of the curdling milk. Västerbottencheese and västerbottensost are registered trademarks owned by Norrmejerier, and the cheese is only produced at their dairy in Burträsk.

It is a hard cow's milk cheese with tiny eyes or holes and a firm and granular texture. As in Cheddar cheese, the curd is heated, cut, and stirred before the cheese is moulded and aged. Strong in flavour, its taste is described as somewhat like Parmesan cheese, salty, but with more bitter notes. It is light yellow in colour and has a fat content of 31%. 
Västerbotten cheese must be aged for at least 12 months, but 14 months is more common practice.

Many Swedish people consider it the king of cheese and demand for it has often outstripped the limited supply. It has also been served as part of the Nobel Diner, and other Royal diners. For this reason, it is roughly twice as expensive as other types of aged cheese. 
In Sweden, Västerbotten cheese is considered a must-have for the late summer crayfish party and is also eaten together with the traditional dish of pickled herring, year round. It adds a distinctive flavour to the highly popular Västerbotten cheese pie, or västerbottensostpaj, as it is known in Sweden. Its filling consists of Västerbotten cheese, cream and eggs, and black pepper. The pie is eaten widely in Sweden, especially during the celebrations of Christmas, Easter, Midsummer and during the crayfish season in August.

See also
 Swedish cuisine

References

Other sources

External links
 Vasterbottensost.com
 Vasterbottensost at Swedishfood.com
 The Swedish Cheese That Can't Be Moved (BBC News) accessed 1 Aug 2015
Västerbottensostpaj recipe

Swedish cheeses
Västerbotten
Cow's-milk cheeses
Grainy cheeses
Purveyors to the Court of Sweden